The Tethered Aerostat Radar System (TARS) is an American low-level airborne ground surveillance system that uses aerostats (moored balloons) as radar platforms.

System 

The aerostats are large fabric envelopes filled with helium, and can rise up to an altitude of  while tethered by a single cable. The largest lifts a 1000 kg payload to an operating altitude providing low-level, downward-looking radar coverage. The aerostat consists of four major parts or assemblies: the hull and fin, windscreen and radar platform, airborne power generator, and rigging, and tether; they are kite balloons obtaining aerodynamic lift from relative wind as well as buoyancy from being lighter than air.

The hull of the aerostat contains two parts separated by a gas-tight fabric partition. The upper chamber is filled with helium and provides the aerostat's lifting capability. The lower chamber of the hull is a pressurized air compartment. The hull is constructed of a lightweight polyurethane-coated Tedlar fabric. An airborne engine drives the generator, supplied by a 100-gallon diesel fuel tank.

Beginning in the late 1990s, the aerostat sites were equipped with Lockheed Martin 420K aerostats. This blimp carries the Lockheed Martin L-88 as its primary payload, a surveillance radar with a range of 370 km (200 nm). The 420K's envelope shape, fin design, and cable attachment points are further optimized for high aerodynamic stability and easy ground handling. While Lockheed Martin is the prime contractor for the 420K aerostats, the envelopes are built by ILC Dover.

As of 2004, all TARS sites except one were equipped with the 420K aerostats. The exception is Cudjoe Key, which uses two smaller, but otherwise similar, Lockheed Martin 275K blimps. One carries the L-88(V)3, a light-weight L-88 derivative, while the other is used to transmit the Radio y Televisión Martí TV program into Cuba.

History 
The first aerostats were assigned to the United States Air Force in December 1980 at Cudjoe Key, Florida. During the 1980s, the U.S. Customs Service operated a network of aerostats to help counter illegal drug trafficking. Their first site was built at High Rock, Grand Bahama in 1984. The second site was built at Fort Huachuca, Arizona in 1986. Before 1992, three agencies operated the TARS network: the Air Force, U.S. Customs Service and U.S. Coast Guard.

The overall responsibility for this program fell to Customs and the Coast Guard, until the US Congress in 1991 and 1992 transferred management to the US Department of Defense, with the Air Force as executive agent. In 1991 the US Congress transferred five aerostats to the Department of the Army to be used to do drug enforcement surveilliance, primarily in the Gulf of Mexico. However, following that transfer, the Department of Army had them parked, and refused to operate them since January 1992.

Under Air Force management, through contract consolidation and system standardization, the operations and maintenance cost per site was reduced from $6 million in fiscal year 1992 to $3.5 million in 2007. 

Since 2003 some 66 Persistent Threat Detection System (PTDS) aerostats have been put into action in Iraq and in Afghanistan for protecting convoys in transit and providing intelligence on enemy troop movements. After success with PTDS, which overlooks cities and large installations, the US Army was interested in fielding a scaled-down, less-expensive system called Persistent Ground Surveillance Systems (PGSS), suitable for smaller forward-operating bases. 

The Budget Control Act of 2011 slashed funding for the Air Force, which tried to shut down the project.  However, the U.S. Customs and Border Protection (CBP) assumed responsibility the Tethered Aerostat Radar System (TARS) project and its funding since fiscal year 2014.

As of FY2022, DHS Funding for the CBP TARS Program has since depleted in October of 2022, the program shutdown was initiated earlier in 2021, but funding remained to keep it alive till exhausted and DOD took up the remaining funding  to continue through the end of FY2022 and slated to keep 4 Sites active through March 31st 2023. Though DoD claims the 4 TARS sites will be active till the end of FY23. The remaining 4 are in the Rio Grande region. A newer system consisting of autonomous tracking and monitoring towers is slated to replace the TARS Sites with autonomous Electronic-Optical technologies for 256 sites along the southwest border and future plans for coastal borders. Anduril Technologies currently holds the contract for the Integrated Fixed Towers or IFT.  General Dynamics is the contractor to build the mobile systems based on heavy duty trucks and can be deployed where-ever needed to dynamically fill gaps.

Operation 
Operators launch the aerostat from a large circular launch pad containing a mooring fixed or mobile system. Operational availability is generally limited only by the weather (60 percent standard) and routine maintenance downtime. The aerostats are stable in winds below . Aerostat and equipment availability averages more than 98 percent system-wide.

Mission 

The primary mission is to provide low-level radar surveillance along the border between the United States and Mexico, the Straits of Florida and the Caribbean in support of federal agencies involved in the nation's drug interdiction program. The secondary mission is to provide North American Aerospace Defense Command with low-level surveillance coverage for air sovereignty in the Florida Straits. The aerostat radar data is available to NORAD and U.S. Customs and Border Protection.

Technical and operational data 
Primary Function: Low-level, downward-looking radar; aircraft detection

Volume: 275,000 and 

Tether Length: 

Payload Weight: 1,200-2,200 pounds

Maximum Detection Range:

Operational Sites 
Sites located at Morgan City, Louisiana, and Matagorda, Texas, are in a cold-storage configuration. Contract management office and logistics hub are located in Newport News, Virginia and El Paso, Texas respectively.

See also
Measurement and Signature Intelligence

References

External links
Directory of U.S. Military Rockets and Missiles: Tethered Aerostats
U.S. Air Force: TETHERED AEROSTAT RADAR SYSTEM

Aerostat radars
Signals intelligence
Radar
United States Department of Homeland Security